This article lists the 250 largest city squares in the world in descending order of area. The areas given are as noted in the articles and references provided, but may not be directly comparable.

See also
List of city squares
Market square
Piazza
Plaza
Town square

References

List by size
Squares By Size
Lists by area